A Blaze of Glory is the first of a new 4-book series, set more in the "Western" theater of the Civil War. This first volume covers the Battle of Shiloh. (The title comes from a marvelous quote from General (later President) James Garfield, who was present at the battle).

References

External links
 Jeff Shaara's Official Site

2012 American novels
Novels set during the American Civil War
Novels by Jeffrey Shaara
Ballantine Books books